Hedoi Etxarte (born 28 April 1986 Pamplona, Navarre) is a Basque violinist and translator.

Life
He graduated in violin from the Conservatorio Superior de Música de Navarra, and in translation and from the University of the Basque Country. He collaborates in the newspaper Berria under the pseudonym Larrepetit, and is one of the promoters of the Katakrak library of Pamplona.

Career
At age 22, he published his first book of poetry in Euskera, titled Suzko liliak (2008) and a few years later he would publish his second book, Simplistak (2012). 
He has also dedicated himself to the comics, first translated into euskera the comic Gaston. 10 (2007) by André Franquin, and in 2009 he wrote the text of the graphic novel Ihes Ederra with illustrations by Alain M. Urrutia, which he translated into Spanish with the title La bella huida (2009). Later Carme Oliveras translated it into Catalan with the title La bella fugida (2010).

In 2014 he published a philosophical essay on Wagner titled Wagner auziaz, preceded by his prologue Iraultza artistiko-politiko baten kasua and with translations into the Basque language of texts by Robert Wangermee, Catherine Clement, Slavoj Zizek and Alain Badiou .

Works
Suzko lilia (2008, Susa) , 
Sinplistak (2012, Susa) Zarautz; Iruñea; Larrabetzu: Susa, 2012. ,

References

External links

1986 births
People from Pamplona
Male violinists
Living people
Basque classical musicians
21st-century violinists
21st-century French male musicians
Spanish male musicians